Aechmea triangularis is a plant species in the genus Aechmea. This species is endemic to the State of Espírito Santo in eastern Brazil.

Cultivars
 Aechmea 'Red Bands'

References

triangularis
Flora of Brazil
Plants described in 1955